Anthene nigropunctata, the black-spotted hairtail, is a butterfly in the family Lycaenidae. It is found in the Democratic Republic of the Congo (Uele and Lualaba), Angola, Tanzania, Malawi, northern Zambia and Zimbabwe.

Adults have been recorded from October to December in Zambia and in March at Chinhoyi in Zimbabwe.

References

Butterflies described in 1910
Anthene